Kunzea similis is a species of flowering plant in the myrtle family, Myrtaceae and is endemic to a small area along the south coast of Western Australia. It is a shrub with linear to lance-shaped leaves with a single vein, and spherical groups of between four and ten pink flowers on the ends of shoots.

Description
Young branches are densely covered with silky hairs. It differs from K. capitata in having leaves with a single vein. The flowers are arranged in more or less spherical groups of between four and ten flowers on the ends of the shoots. There are lance-shaped to egg-shaped bracts and pairs of bracteoles at the base of the flowers. Flowering occurs from September to November and the fruit is an urn-shaped capsule.

Taxonomy and naming
Kunzea similis was first formally described in 1996 by Hellmut R. Toelken and the description was published in Journal of the Adelaide Botanic Garden. The specific epithet (similis) is a Latin word meaning "like".

Two subspecies were described in 2007 by Toelken and Gillian Craig and are accepted by the Australian Plant Census:
 Kunzea similis Toelken  subsp. similis, a smaller shrub with bracteoles that are hidden between the flowers.

Distribution and habitat
Subspecies similis occurs in the Fitzgerald River National Park near Hopetoun, where it grows in sparse, low heath. Subspecies mediterranea is found in a small area to the east of Ravensthorpe growing on a ridge top in open mallee and dense heath.

Conservation status
Both subspecies of K. similis are classified as "Threatened Flora (Declared Rare Flora — Extant)" by the Department of Environment and Conservation (Western Australia). Subspecies similis is listed as "critically endangered" under the Australian Government Environment Protection and Biodiversity Conservation Act 1999. The main threat to the subspecies is the fungal disease caused by Phytophthora cinnamomi.

References

similis
Endemic flora of Western Australia
Myrtales of Australia
Rosids of Western Australia
Plants described in 1996
Taxa named by Hellmut R. Toelken